I Am Big Bird: The Caroll Spinney Story is a 2014 American documentary film about Caroll Spinney, the original performer of Sesame Street characters Big Bird and Oscar the Grouch. The film has received generally positive reviews. It has been shown at many film festivals, including the April 2014 Hot Docs Festival.

Reception

Commercial performance 
The film grossed $75,156 in box office receipts and $174,553 in DVD sales, bringing the total revenue up to $249,709.

Critical reception 
The film has received positive reviews. On review aggregator Rotten Tomatoes, the film holds an approval rating of 84% based on 73 reviews, with an average rating of 6.7/10. The website's critical consensus reads, "Every bit as good-natured as longtime fans might hope, I Am Big Bird: The Carroll Spinney Story offers heartwarming behind-the-scenes perspective on a cultural icon." On Metacritic, the film received a weighted average score of 71 out of 100 based on 20 critics, indicating "generally favorable reviews".

References

External links
 
 
 
 
 

2014 films
American independent films
2014 documentary films
Documentary films about entertainers
Documentary films about television people
American documentary films
Sesame Street
2010s English-language films
2010s American films